Peirce is a given name. Notable people with the name include:

Peirce Crosby (1824–1899), U.S. Navy rear admiral
Peirce F. Lewis (1927–2018), American geographer
Peirce Lynch (fl. 1485–1486), Irish politician
Peirce Ó Caiside (died 1504), Gaelic-Irish physician and writer

See also
Pearce (given name)
Pierce (given name)
Peirce (surname)